Morris Franklin (October 20, 1801 – October 22, 1885) was an American lawyer, businessman and politician from New York.

Life
He was born on October 20, 1801, in New York City, the son of Thomas Franklin, a merchant and chief engineer of the Volunteer Fire Department from 1799 to 1812. He studied law and was admitted to the bar.

He was a member of the New York State Assembly (New York Co.) in 1837 and a member of the New York State Senate (1st D.) in 1842 and 1843.

In 1844, Franklin was the Whig candidate for Mayor of New York City, but was defeated by James Harper who ran as the candidate of the American Republican Party.

Franklin was President of the Board of Aldermen of New York City from 1847 to 1849.

He was President of the New York Life Insurance Company from 1848 until after 1870.

He died on October 22, 1885, in Flushing, Queens.

References

Sources
The New York Civil List compiled by Franklin Benjamin Hough (pages 133f, 141, 219 and 274; Weed, Parsons and Co., 1858)
The Insurance Times (issue of April 1870; pg. 247)
Manual of the Corporation of the City of New York for 1852 by D. T. Valentine (pg. 363)

1801 births
1885 deaths
New York (state) state senators
New York (state) Whigs
19th-century American politicians
Members of the New York State Assembly
New York City Council members
New York Life Insurance Company